Copiula alpestris is a species of frog in the family Microhylidae. The specific name is a Latin adjective meaning "living in high mountains", in reference to its relatively high-altitude habitats. Based on molecular evidence, the species was transferred from Oxydactyla to Copiula in 2016.

Description
Copiula alpestris is a stout, short-legged frog. The dorsum is medium brown. The side of the head and the eyelids are darker, approaching black. There are a few light flecks on the upper lips. There is also a dark brown streak that begins behind the eye, broadens as it passes above and behind the indistinct tympanum, and fades into the ground color posteriorly. The ventral ground color is pale tan. The fingers and toes are unwebbed and without discs.

Habitat and conservation
Its natural habitats are montane forests where it occurs on saturated ground under moss. It is quite common. There are no known threats facing this species living in relatively isolated areas.

References

alpestris
Amphibians of Papua New Guinea
Endemic fauna of Papua New Guinea
Taxa named by Richard G. Zweifel
Taxonomy articles created by Polbot
Amphibians described in 2000